Qatlish-ye Sofla (also Romanized as Qatlīsh-ye Soflá; also known as Qatlīsh and Kātlīsh) is a village in Gifan Rural District, Garmkhan District, Bojnord County, North Khorasan Province, Iran. At the 2006 census, its population was 428, in 97 families.

References 

Populated places in Bojnord County